Ali Iyad Ali Olwan (born 26 March 2000) is a Jordanian professional footballer who plays as a forward for Qatari club Al-Shamal and the Jordan national team.

International career
Scores and results list Jordan goal tally first.

References

External links
 
 

2000 births
Living people
Jordanian footballers
Jordanian expatriate footballers
Jordan international footballers
Association football defenders
Jordanian Pro League players
Qatar Stars League players
Al-Jazeera (Jordan) players
Al-Shamal SC players
Expatriate footballers in Qatar
Jordanian expatriate sportspeople in Qatar